Wicki is a surname. Notable people with the surname include: 

Alain Wicki, Swiss skeleton racer
Berenice Wicki (born 2002), Swiss snowboarder
Bernhard Wicki (1919–2000), Austrian actor and film director
Franz Wicki, (born 1939), Swiss politician and lawyer
Jean Wicki (born 1933), Swiss bobsledder

See also
Wicki-Hayden note layout, a musical keyboard layout
Wicky (disambiguation)
Wiki (disambiguation)